Robert 'Robby' Langers (born 1 August 1960) is a Luxembourgish former professional footballer who played as a striker. He was voted Luxembourgish Sportsman of the Year in 1987.

Club career
Langers started his career at local side Union Luxembourg but was loaned to German Bundesliga outfit Borussia Mönchengladbach aged 20. After two seasons on the sub's bench and in the reserves he moved to France to play for seven different teams in ten seasons, both in Ligue 1 and Ligue 2. While at US Orléans he became top goalscorer of Ligue 2. At Cannes he played alongside a youngster named Zinedine Zidane.

In 1992. Langers moved east to Swiss sides Yverdon-Sport and Etoile Carouge, then played with Eintracht Trier in Germany before returning home to play for F91 Dudelange and end his career in fashion by scoring 14 goals for his first club Union Luxembourg.

International career
Langers made his debut for the Luxembourg national team in a September 1980 World Cup qualification match against Yugoslavia and won 73 caps for Luxembourg over a period of eighteen years, and scored eight goals in the process. He played in 35 FIFA World Cup qualification matches.

His international career coincided with two more of Luxembourg's most successful players: Guy Hellers and Carlo Weis. He played his final international game in May 1998, against Cameroon in which he came on as a second-half substitute and was himself substituted a few minutes later in his honour.

Career statistics
Scores and results list Luxembourg's goal tally first, score column indicates score after each Langers goal.

Honours
Metz
Coupe de France: 1983–84

Individual
 Luxembourgish Sportsman of the Year: 1987

References

External links
 
 

1960 births
Living people
Sportspeople from Luxembourg City
Luxembourgian footballers
Luxembourgian expatriate footballers
Luxembourg international footballers
Racing FC Union Luxembourg players
Borussia Mönchengladbach players
Olympique de Marseille players
FC Metz players
En Avant Guingamp players
OGC Nice players
AS Cannes players
US Orléans players
Yverdon-Sport FC players
SV Eintracht Trier 05 players
F91 Dudelange players
Bundesliga players
Ligue 1 players
Ligue 2 players
Expatriate footballers in Germany
Quimper Kerfeunteun F.C. players
Expatriate footballers in France
Expatriate footballers in Switzerland
Étoile Carouge FC players
Luxembourgian expatriate sportspeople in Switzerland
Luxembourgian expatriate sportspeople in Germany
Luxembourgian expatriate sportspeople in France
Association football forwards
Expatriate footballers in West Germany
Luxembourgian expatriate sportspeople in West Germany